Michel Billière (16 July 1943 – 31 January 2020) was a French rugby union player who played flanker.

Career
Billière graduated from the École de Rugby du SCR in 1955, and subsequently joined Sporting Club Rieumois, where he played until 1967. In 1967, he joined Stade Toulousain and stayed until his retirement in 1974. At Toulouse, he sometimes substituted as goal scorer for Pierre Villepreux and Jean-Louis Bérot.

From 1977 to 1989, he was deputy mayor and a municipal councillor in Rieumes.

In 1991, Billière received a bronze medal from the French Rugby Federation. He received a silver medal from the Mérite sportif de la Jeunesse et des Sports in 2004. In October of that year, he became a member of the Académie toulousaine de Rugby.

In 2010, he became Vice-President of the Amis du Stade toulousain, part of the Stade Ernest-Wallon complex. On 27 June 2019, he became President, alongside Franck Belot.

Michel Billière died on 31 January 2020.

References

1943 births
2020 deaths
Sportspeople from Haute-Garonne
French rugby union players
Rugby union flankers